The State Register of Heritage Places is maintained by the Heritage Council of Western Australia. , 91 places are heritage-listed in the Shire of Kojonup, of which three are on the State Register of Heritage Places.

List

State Register of Heritage Places
The Western Australian State Register of Heritage Places, lists the following three state registered places within the Shire of Kojonup:

Shire of Kojonup heritage-listed places
The following places are heritage listed in the Shire of Kojonup but are not State registered:

References

Kojonup
Kojonup